Louise Burrows (née Cooke; born 11 March 1978) is a former Australian rugby union player. She represented  at four Rugby World Cups — 2002, 2006, 2014 and 2017.

Burrows is a physical education teacher at Canberra Girls Grammar. In 1995, She joined the Royals Rugby Union club in Canberra when she was 17. She has represented the ACT. 

Burrows made her international debut for the Wallaroos against England in 2001 at Sydney. She played her last test at the 2017 Rugby World Cup against Canada.

In January 2020, she joined the Brumbies squad for the Super W competition. She is an inaugural inductee of the University of Canberra Sports Walk of Fame in 2022.

References

External links 
 Wallaroos Profile

1978 births
Living people
Australia women's international rugby union players
Australian female rugby union players
Rugby union hookers
Rugby union props
Sportswomen from the Australian Capital Territory
University of Canberra alumni